is one of the eight wards located in Hiroshima, Japan. It is located on the uppermost delta of the Ōta River.

Within Higashi-ku is the Fudoin Temple in Ushita-shinmachi. Fudoin dates back to the 14th century and was built by shōgun Ashikaga Takauji as one of 60 Ankoku-ji temples which were constructed in all provinces across Japan. The Kondo (main hall) of the Fudoin Temple, one of the largest remaining structures in the medieval Kara style in the country, is the only designated national treasure in Hiroshima City.

Education

The ward has a North Korean school, Hiroshima Korean School.

The South Korean government maintains the Korea Education Institution in Higashi-ku.

References

External links

Wards of Hiroshima